Junior technician (Jnr Tech or formerly J/T) is a junior non-commissioned rank in the Royal Air Force, the Pakistan Air Force and the Royal Danish Air Force.  In the RAF it ranks equivalent to senior aircraftman technician (AS1 (T)), equivalent to senior aircraftman (AS1) and below corporal and has a NATO rank code of OR-2.  Since 2005, the RAF has ceased promoting to and therefore phasing out of this rank, to be replaced by AS1(T).

United Kingdom
The rank of junior technician is only held by airmen in technical trades and by musicians.  Airmen in non-technical trades always progressed directly from senior aircraftman to corporal. Junior technicians are qualified to work alone and supervise untrained airmen working within their area of responsibility. The rank was introduced in 1950 as part of a new grading system for technicians, wearing a single point up chevron. In 1964, when the grading system was abolished, JTs were retained, their badge changing to a four-bladed propeller.

In 2000 the Royal Air Force changed the rank to Senior Aircraftman (Technician), (SAC(T)). In 2005 promotions to the rank of junior technician ceased. However, those previously promoted continue to be at JT rank until they are promoted to Corporal or leave the service. JT is considered to be equivalent to Lance Corporal in the Army but without the power to discipline junior ranks.

It is believed that the Royal Air Force has one JT still serving. He insists on keeping his rank until his service is complete, due to his belief that “JT mate, best rank in RAF” even if he is the only one.

Pakistan
Junior technician is also a rank in the Pakistan Air Force, where it ranks between corporal technician and senior aircraftman. Since 2006 it has been represented by single chevron beneath an eagle with outstretched wings.

Denmark
Junior technician is the title for personnel working in the Royal Danish Air Force after two years' seniority as an aircraftman (OR-1) and until the age of 35. If still fit for duty at the age of 35, personnel are promoted to lance corporal (OR-3).

See also
RAF other ranks

References

Military ranks of the Royal Air Force
Air force ranks
Technicians